David Kenneth Hay Dale, CBE (27 January 1927 – 8 November 2001) was a British colonial administrator. He was Governor of Montserrat from 1980 to 1984 or 1985.

References 
 

Governors of Montserrat
1927 births
2001 deaths